The city of Turku, Finland is divided into nine wards (see Wards of Turku), which in turn are divided into 78 non-governmental districts ( in Finnish,  in Swedish). These are composed of individual suburbs, and in the very centre of the city, sectors of the central business district are identified by Roman numerals. This is a list of the districts in Turku in alphabetical order, grouped by wards.

The names are given first in Finnish, and then in Swedish (if applicable) in brackets. For districts that have an English name, it is given first with other languages following. When a district is divided between two or three wards, it is listed under each and this is indicated by a footnote.

City Centre (Ward 1) 

 I District
 II District
 III District
 IV District - Martti (Martins)
 V District - Itäranta (Öststranden)
 VI District
 VII District
 VIII District - Port Arthur
 IX District - Länsiranta (Väststranden)
 Iso-Heikkilä (Storheikkilä)
 Korppolaismäki (Korppolaisbacken)
 Kupittaa (Kuppis)
 Kurjenmäki (Tranbacken)
 Kähäri
 Mäntymäki (Tallbacka)
 Pihlajaniemi (Rönnudden)
 Pitkämäki (Långbacka)
 Pohjola (Norrstan)
 Port of Turku (Turun satama/Åbo hamn)
 Raunistula
 Vähäheikkilä (Lillheikkilä)
 Vätti

Hirvensalo-Kakskerta (Ward 2) 

 Friskala
 Haarla (Harlax)
 Illoinen (Illois)
 Jänessaari
 Kaistarniemi (Kaistarudden)
 Kakskerta
 Kukola
 Lauttaranta (Färjstranden)
 Maanpää
 Moikoinen (Moikois)
 Oriniemi
 Papinsaari
 Pikisaari (Beckholmen)
 Satava
 Särkilahti
 Toijainen (Toijais)

Uittamo-Skanssi (Ward 3) 

 Harittu
 Ilpoinen (Ilpois)
 Ispoinen (Ispois)
 Katariina (Katarina)
 Koivula (Björkas)
 Luolavuori
 Peltola
 Pihlajaniemi (Rönnudden)
 Puistomäki (Parkbacken)
 Skanssi (Skansen)
 Uittamo
 Vasaramäki (Hammarbacka)

Itäharju-Varissuo (Ward 4) 

 Huhkola
 Itäharju (Österås)
 Kohmo
 Kurala
 Lauste (Laustis)
 Nummi (Nummis)
 Pääskyvuori (Svalberga)
 Vaala (Svalas)
 Varissuo (Kråkkärret)

Koroinen (Ward 5) 

 Koroinen (Korois)
 Halinen (Hallis)
 Nummi (Nummis)
 Oriketo
 Räntämäki

Tampereentie (Ward 6) 

 Kaerla
 Kastu
 Kärsämäki
 Raunistula
 Runosmäki (Runosbacken)

Kuninkoja (Ward 7) 

 Kähäri
 Mälikkälä
 Pitkämäki (Långbacka)
 Runosmäki (Runosbacken)
 Ruohonpää
 Teräsrautela
 Vätti

Naantalintie (Ward 8) 

 Artukainen (Artukais)
 Pahaniemi
 Pansio
 Perno
 Pitkämäki (Långbacka)
 Ruissalo (Runsala)

Maaria-Paattinen (Ward 9) 

 Turku Airport (Turun lentoasema/Åbo flygstation)
 Jäkärlä
 Paattinen (Patis)
 Saramäki (Starbacka)
 Yli-Maaria (Övre S:t Marie)

Notes 
 The districts of Kähäri and Vätti are divided between City Centre and Kuninkoja.
 The district of Pihlajaniemi is divided between City Centre and Uittamo-Skanssi.
 The district of Pitkämäki is divided between City Centre, Kuninkoja and Naantalintie.
 The district of Raunistula is divided between City Centre and Tampereentie.
 The district of Nummi is divided between Itäharju-Varissuo and Koroinen.
 The district of Runosmäki is divided between Tampereentie and Kuninkoja.

See also 
 Districts of Turku by population
 Wards of Turku